The 2002 Chrono des Herbiers was the 21st edition of the Chrono des Nations cycle race and was held on 22 October 2002. The race started and finished in Les Herbiers. The race was won by Michael Rich.

General classification

References

2002
2002 in road cycling
2002 in French sport
October 2002 sports events in France